United Liberation Front of Western South East Asia (UNLFW) separatists ambushed a military convoy in Chandel district on 4 June 2015, resulting in the loss of life for eighteen soldiers of the Indian Army. Fifteen soldiers also suffered serious injury.  The United Liberation Front, a separatist group operating in North-east India, publicly claimed responsibility for the deadly attack.

In response to United Liberation Front attack on Indian troops, Indian military successfully carried out a cross-border operation into Myanmar. Indian officials confirm that the cross border operation resulted in the death of 15-20 separatists belonging to NSCN-K who were believed to be responsible for the attack on Indian armed forces in Manipur. However, Myanmar government rejected Indian claims and stated that the Indian military operation against separatists took place entirely on Indian side of the border and Indian troops did not cross Myanmar's border.

NSCN-K suffered casualties. According to the NSCN-K, Indian troops attacked 2 camps belonging to the NSCN-K and NSCN-IM.  The Indian government has claimed that more than 120 militants were neutralised.

References 

Insurgency in Northeast India
2015 in India
2010s in Manipur
Terrorist incidents in India in 2015